Abdul Kadir Raden Temenggung Setia Pahlawan (1771 – 1875) is now regarded as a National Hero of Indonesia. He was the only Indonesian National Hero to die at the age of over 100. He died at the age of 104, just 3 weeks after being captured by the Dutch.

References

National Heroes of Indonesia
1771 births
1875 deaths
Indonesian centenarians
Men centenarians
19th-century Indonesian people
18th-century Indonesian people